Magdy Ashour is an Egyptian activist.

A father of four, Magdy was abducted and tortured under Hosni Mubarak’s rule for being part of the banned Muslim Brotherhood. He is depicted in the movie The Square as he takes parts on events on Tahrir square during the 18 days of the 2011 revolution. Magdy sided with the revolutionaries against Egypt's deposed president, Mohamed Morsi.

in 2014, Magdy Ashour was confined to his home for fear of arrest under the military's condemnation of the Muslim Brotherhood as a terrorist organization. In 2015, he was reported to have been arrested, his whereabouts unknown.

References 

Egyptian activists
Living people
Year of birth missing (living people)